Death Valley Days is an American old-time radio and television anthology series featuring true accounts of the American Old West, particularly the Death Valley country of southeastern California. Created in 1930 by Ruth Woodman, the program was broadcast on radio until 1945. From 1952 to 1970, it became a syndicated television series, with reruns (updated with new narrations) continuing through August 1, 1975. The radio and television versions combined to make the show "one of the longest-running Western programs in broadcast history."

Series overview

Episodes

Season 1 (1952-53)

Season 2 (1953-54)

Season 3 (1954-55)

Season 4 (1955-56)

Season 5 (1956-57)

Season 6 (1957-58)

Season 7 (1958-59)

Season 8 (1959-60)

Season 9 (1960-61)

Season 10 (1961-62)

Season 11 (1962-63)
Season 11 has 3 episodes produced in color, episodes 7, 8 and 9.

Season 12 (1963-64)
Season 12 has 10 episodes produced in color, episodes 1, 2, 3, 8, 9, 11, 12, 13, 15 and 20.

Season 13 (1964-65)
All episodes in color.

Season 14 (1965-66)

Season 15 (1966-67)

Season 16 (1967-68)

Season 17 (1968-69)

Season 18 (1969-70)

References

Lists of American Western (genre) television series episodes

External links
 
 
 Death Valley Days at tvguide.com